Players and pairs who neither have high enough rankings nor receive wild cards may participate in a qualifying tournament held one week before the annual Wimbledon Tennis Championships.

Seeds

  Ingelise Driehuis /  Louise Pleming (qualifying competition)
  Jessica Emmons /  Ann Henricksson (second round)
  Louise Stacey /  Angie Woolcock (qualifying competition)
  Akiko Kijimuta /  Naoko Sawamatsu (qualified)
  Justine Hodder /  Kirrily Sharpe (qualified)
  Lindsay Davenport /  Stella Sampras (qualifying competition)
  Carin Bakkum /  Maria Strandlund (qualified)
  Danielle Jones /  Tessa Price (qualified)

Qualifiers

  Carin Bakkum /  Maria Strandlund
  Justine Hodder /  Kirrily Sharpe
  Akiko Kijimuta /  Naoko Sawamatsu
  Danielle Jones /  Tessa Price

Qualifying draw

First qualifier

Second qualifier

Third qualifier

Fourth qualifier

External links

1992 Wimbledon Championships – Women's draws and results at the International Tennis Federation

Women's Doubles Qualifying
Wimbledon Championship by year – Women's doubles qualifying
Wimbledon Championships